Happy Street is a studio album by Slim Whitman, released in 1968 on Imperial Records.

It is a "happy"-themed album.

Track listing 
The album was issued in the United States and Canada by Imperial Records as a 12-inch long-playing record, catalog number LP-12411 (stereo).

Charts

References 

1968 albums
Slim Whitman albums
Imperial Records albums
Albums produced by Scott Turner (songwriter)